Peter Caven (born 16 May 1970) is a former Australian rules footballer who played in the Australian Football League.  He played initially as a nagging, sometimes ungainly but effective defender and built on this base to become a sweeping counterattacking central defender. He began his career at Fitzroy before playing at the Sydney Swans and finally at Adelaide where he was a 2-time premiership player.

Career

Fitzroy 
Caven was zoned to Fitzroy and progressing from under 17s and 19s to reserves under coach Robert Shaw before making his AFL debut in 1991 as a forward however Caven would go on to play a majority of career in defence. After three AFL seasons with Fitzroy, Caven could not come to terms with the club and left as an uncontracted signing to Sydney.

Sydney 
In Round 7, 1994, Caven was the victim of an infamous act of AFL thuggery when 's Tony Lockett struck him viciously in the face and broke his cheekbone during the game. Lockett was handed a heavy suspension of eight weeks for the incident while Caven missed 12 weeks and returned to play the last four games of the season. In an absurd twist, Caven was forced to issue an apology to Lockett the following week after appearing on comedy television show Denton and, at the urging of host Andrew Denton, bashing an effigy of Lockett with a baseball bat. The following season, Caven and Lockett were teammates at Sydney.

He would only play 9 games in 1995; and, after failing to return to form after his broken cheek, Caven was told he is not good enough to play AFL football by Sydney football manager Rob Snowden.

Adelaide 
The Crows were interested in Caven due to his previous connection with coach Robert Shaw and he was traded for Paul Rouvray at the end of the 1995 season. After a double hernia operation in pre season, Cavens first game was against Sydney in Round 1, 1996, where he had a point to prove. Playing on a half-forward flank he kicked four goals in a comfortable win.  Caven played a majority of 1996 as a forward kicking 17 goals in 20 games.

In 1997, Caven found himself out of favour with new coach Malcolm Blight and started the season playing for Sturt in the SANFL. He returned for the Crows in round 4 and played 22 games including the Grand Final win. Caven's form at centre half-back was so good that he was considered unfortunate to miss out on All-Australian selection.

The next year would prove to be another fine season for Caven, topped off with a magnificent performance in the 1998 Grand Final on Wayne Carey, where he kept him to one goal. Caven also collected 20 possessions and nine marks on the day.

Statistics

|-
|- style="background-color: #EAEAEA"
! scope="row" style="text-align:center" | 1991
|style="text-align:center;"|
| 50 || 8 || 8 || 4 || 43 || 27 || 70 || 13 || 5 || 1.0 || 0.5 || 5.4 || 3.4 || 8.8 || 1.6 || 0.6
|-
! scope="row" style="text-align:center" | 1992
|style="text-align:center;"|
| 22 || 22 || 6 || 10 || 179 || 65 || 244 || 74 || 35 || 0.3 || 0.5 || 8.1 || 3.0 || 11.1 || 3.4 || 1.6
|- style="background-color: #EAEAEA"
! scope="row" style="text-align:center" | 1993
|style="text-align:center;"|
| 22 || 9 || 3 || 2 || 43 || 47 || 90 || 23 || 12 || 0.3 || 0.2 || 4.8 || 5.2 || 10.0 || 2.6 || 1.3
|-
! scope="row" style="text-align:center" | 1994
|style="text-align:center;"|
| 26 || 9 || 3 || 2 || 41 || 31 || 72 || 19 || 11 || 0.3 || 0.2 || 4.6 || 3.4 || 8.0 || 2.1 || 1.2
|- style="background-color: #EAEAEA"
! scope="row" style="text-align:center" | 1995
|style="text-align:center;"|
| 26 || 9 || 1 || 1 || 45 || 20 || 65 || 24 || 3 || 0.1 || 0.1 || 5.0 || 2.2 || 7.2 || 2.7 || 0.3
|-
! scope="row" style="text-align:center" | 1996
|style="text-align:center;"|
| 44 || 20 || 17 || 19 || 143 || 85 || 228 || 90 || 18 || 0.9 || 1.0 || 7.2 || 4.3 || 11.4 || 4.5 || 0.9
|- style="background-color: #EAEAEA"
! scope="row" style="text-align:center;" | 1997
|style="text-align:center;"|
| 44 || 22 || 6 || 9 || 264 || 94 || 358 || 116 || 30 || 0.3 || 0.4 || 12.0 || 4.3 || 16.3 || 5.3 || 1.4
|-
! scope="row" style="text-align:center;" | 1998
|style="text-align:center;"|
| 44 || 24 || 9 || 7 || 219 || 75 || 294 || 99 || 43 || 0.4 || 0.3 || 9.1 || 3.1 || 12.3 || 4.1 || 1.8
|- style="background-color: #EAEAEA"
! scope="row" style="text-align:center" | 1999
|style="text-align:center;"|
| 44 || 8 || 0 || 3 || 48 || 26 || 74 || 20 || 10 || 0.0 || 0.4 || 6.0 || 3.3 || 9.3 || 2.5 || 1.3
|-
! scope="row" style="text-align:center" | 2000
|style="text-align:center;"|
| 44 || 8 || 2 || 2 || 48 || 32 || 80 || 17 || 12 || 0.3 || 0.3 || 6.0 || 4.0 || 10.0 || 2.1 || 1.5
|- class="sortbottom"
! colspan=3| Career
! 139
! 55
! 59
! 1073
! 502
! 1575
! 495
! 179
! 0.4
! 0.4
! 7.7
! 3.6
! 11.3
! 3.6
! 1.3
|}

References 

1970 births
Living people
Australian rules footballers from Victoria (Australia)
Adelaide Football Club players
Adelaide Football Club Premiership players
Fitzroy Football Club players
Sydney Swans players
Montmorency Football Club players
Sturt Football Club players
Two-time VFL/AFL Premiership players